Serhiy Chepornyuk (born 18 April 1982), is a Ukrainian futsal player who plays for Energy Lviv and the Ukraine national futsal team.

References

External links 
 UEFA profile

1982 births
Living people
Ukrainian men's futsal players
SK Energia Lviv players